This is a list of museums in Ecuador. The national museums network holds more than 700,000 artifacts in 14 museums.

Museums in Ecuador 
 Alabado House Pre-Columbian Art Museum
 Alberto Mena Caamaño Museum
 Benjamín Carrión Palace
 Carondelet Palace
 Casa de la Cultura Ecuatoriana
 Casa del Alabado Museum of Pre-Columbian Art
 City Museum (Quito)
 Ciudad Mitad del Mundo
 Cochasquí
 Ecuador National Museum of Medicine
 Guayaquil Municipal Museum
 Gustavo Orcés V. Natural History Museum
 La Capilla del Hombre
 Luis Adolfo Noboa Naranjo Museum
 Martínez-Holguín House Museum
 Metropolitan Cultural Center
 Museo Antropologico y de Arte Contemporaneo
 Museo Camilo Egas
 Museum for Religious Art in Old Cathedral of Cuenca
 Old Cathedral of Cuenca
 Presley Norton Museum
 Quito Astronomical Observatory
 Sucre House

See also 
 List of museums by country

References

External links 
 Red de Museos Nacionales

Ecuador
 
Museums
Ecuador
Museums